Sanam Pao station is a BTS skytrain station, on the Sukhumvit Line in Phaya Thai District, Bangkok, Thailand. The station is on Phahon Yothin Road near Soi Phahon Yothin 3 in Sanam Pao area, among office towers, an army base, and the site of Royal Thai Army Radio and Television Channel 5.

See also
 Bangkok Skytrain

BTS Skytrain stations